Mário Lemos is a Portuguese former footballer who played mostly as an attacking midfielder, and is the current head coach of Dhaka Abahani and the Bangladesh national football team. On 21 October 2021, Dhaka Abahani manager Lemos was given the role of interim head coach, for the 2021 Four Nations Football Tournament held in Sri Lanka. After beating Maldives for the first time in 18 years they were knocked out by Sri Lanka.

Managerial statistics

Honours

Dhaka Abahani
 2019 AFC Cup: South Asia Zone Champions
 2019 Bangladesh Premier League: Runner-up
 Independence Cup: 2021–22 Champion
 Federation Cup: 2021–22 Champion
 2022 Bangladesh Premier League: Runner-up
up
 Independence Cup: 2021–22 3rd Place

References

1984 births
Living people
People from Albufeira
Portuguese footballers
Association football midfielders
Portuguese football managers
Portuguese expatriate football managers
Expatriate football managers in Malaysia
Expatriate football managers in Bangladesh
Bangladesh national football team managers
Bangladesh Football Premier League managers
Sportspeople from Faro District
Abahani Limited Dhaka managers